FreeOTP is a free and open-source software token that can be used for two-factor authentication. It provides implementations of HOTP and TOTP. Tokens can be added by scanning a QR code or by manually entering in the token configuration. It is maintained by Red Hat under the Apache 2.0 license, and supports Android and iOS.

FreeOTP Plus (aka FreeOTP+) is a fork of FreeOTP with enhancements including exporting and importing settings.

Both are available in the F-Droid software repository.

See also

 Google Authenticator
 LinOTP
 Security token
 Comparison of TOTP applications

References

External links 
 

Computer access control
Authentication methods
Password authentication
Red Hat software